Scapanus is a genus of moles in the family Talpidae. They live in North America from west of the Rockies south to Baja California del Norte, and north to British Columbia, wherever conditions permit a mole population; that is to say, apart from the most sandy, rocky, or developed places.  As they are one genus, they are very closely related, but as species, they rarely if ever interbreed successfully.

It contains the following living species:
 Mexican mole (S. anthonyi)
Northern broad-footed mole (S. latimanus)
Southern broad-footed mole (S. occultus)
 Coast mole (S. orarius)
 Townsend's mole (S. townsendii)

In addition, there are several extinct species known from fossils. 
Scapanus hagermanensis (Mid Blancan stage, Idaho) 
Scapanus malatinus (Blancan-Quaternary, California)
Scapanus proceridens (Miocene, Oregon and Idaho)
Scapanus shultzi (Miocene, California and Oregon)

Distribution
Townsend's mole is primarily a Californian mole, although its range spills over into neighboring states. The broad-footed mole lives primarily in western Oregon, Washington, and southwestern British Columbia, where it often overlaps the smaller range of the Pacific or coast mole, which, as the name implies, does not tend to range as far inland.  The broad-footed is one of the largest and most powerful moles, while the coast mole is a quite average-sized mole.

References

 Scapanus, IUCN

Scapanus
Mammal genera
Mammals of North America
Taxonomy articles created by Polbot